Luis Sodiro (1836–1909) was a  Jesuit priest and a field botanist who described a large number of species from the area around Quito, Ecuador in the early 20th century. He was perhaps the first person who collected in this region and he described at least 38 species from Esmeraldas, a region in Ecuador.

Sources

 IPNI.ORG Details
History and Current Status of Systematic Research with Araceae; International Aroid Society; retrieved 28 December 2007.

19th-century Italian Jesuits
Botanists active in South America
1836 births
1909 deaths
20th-century Italian Jesuits